The  are snake deities in Japanese folklore appearing in the Hitachi no Kuni Fudoki. They lived in Namegata county, in fields near the government office. Yato no kami were rumored to bring familial extermination on anyone who saw them.

It's told that Yato no kami were killed and enshrined by a man named Yahazu no uji no Matachi during the time when Emperor Keitai was in reign. The Yato no kami vanished later when a man named Mibunomuroji Maro drove them away from disturbing him and his workers who were building a moat there.

In popular culture 
Yato-no-kami appeared as a major villain in GeGeGe no Kitarō: Nippon Bakuretsu!! in 2008.

In the 2020 action role-playing game Nioh 2, Yato-no-Kami (named Yatsu-no-Kami in-game) makes an appearance as a boss enemy that protagonist has to fight in order to progress. In the game, it takes the form of a giant snake, with 2 smaller snakes protruding from its body.

In June 2015's Fire Emblem Fates, the protagonist wields the sword Yato, named after Yato-no-kami. It is their main weapon after Chapter 5 of the story.

In Noragami, Yato is the titular stray god of the series (Noragami) who wants to build his own shrine.

References
https://en.wikipedia.org/wiki/Fire_Emblem_Fates

External links
Evolution of the Concept of Kami
夜刀の神(ヤトノカミ・ヤツノカミ)
民俗ネオ神道 – minzoku NEO-shintô – araburu-kami

Japanese legendary creatures
Legendary serpents